is a Japanese former professional tennis player.

On 12 May 2008, she reached her career-high singles ranking of world No. 208. In April 2008, she reached her best doubles ranking of No. 137.

In her career, she won three singles and 15 doubles titles on the ITF Women's Circuit. Akiko is the sister of Tomoko Yonemura.

ITF Circuit finals

Singles: 12 (3–9)

Doubles: 30 (15–15)

External links
 
 
 

1984 births
Living people
Japanese female tennis players
20th-century Japanese women
21st-century Japanese women